The September 11 attacks transformed the first term of President George W. Bush and led to what he has called the war on terror. The accuracy of describing it as a "war" and its political motivations and consequences are the topic of strenuous debate. The U.S. government increased military operations, economic measures, and political pressure on groups that it accused of being terrorists, as well as increasing pressure on the governments and countries which were accused of sheltering them. October 2001 saw the first military action initiated by the US. Under this policy, NATO invaded Afghanistan to remove the Taliban regime (which harbored al-Qaeda) and capture al-Qaeda forces.

Critics point out that the Afghan conflict has contributed to the destabilization of neighbouring Pakistan and Afghanistan has undergone a long war, culminating in the return of the Taliban in 2021. The US government has also asserted that the US invasion of Iraq is connected to 9/11.

Immediate

Rescue and recovery

Because of the events that took place on September 11, 2001, American society as a whole suffered dramatically. Recovery took years, and the economy declined drastically after the attacks. Various first responders came together that day to unite and help as much as possible. Whether they were police officers, firefighters, doctors, nurses, or ordinary civilians, the main objective was to cooperate and help the wounded. More than 1,500 first responders, ironworkers, engineers, heavy equipment operators, and other workers worked at Ground Zero to attempt to find survivors and clean up the wreckage. Cranes and bulldozers were brought in along with search and rescue dogs in order to locate survivors and bodies of the deceased, however, operations were hindered by the presence of approximately two feet of soot at the site, which obscured objects and bodies. 
In the immediate aftermath of the attacks, only 20 survivors were pulled alive from the rubble, although there were several human remains and belongings that were removed from the site. The day after the attack, then-mayor Rudy Giuliani told reporters that they were receiving mobile phone calls from people trapped in the debris. The task of removing debris and rubble continued well into 2002, with some 108,000 truckloads of 1.8 million tons of rubble removed by May 2002.

Hazards 
Outside of the general hazards due to fires, falling debris, heavy machinery, broken metal, and hazardous air conditions, there were also hidden concerns within the clean-up zone. The parking garage under the World Trade Center at the time of the attacks held nearly 2,000 automobiles; each held an estimated 5 gallons of gasoline, which could ignite and explode. Other concerns were around buried fuel tanks that were located on the site, and the 1.2 million rounds of ammunition that were housed at Building 6 for the use of the U.S. Customs Service.

US public reaction

Following the September 11, 2001 attacks, George W. Bush's job approval rating soared to 86%. On September 20, 2001, the president spoke before the nation and a joint-session of Congress, regarding the events of that day, the intervening nine days of rescue and recovery efforts, and his intent in response to those events in going after the terrorists who orchestrated the attacks. In the speech, he characterized the speech itself as being akin to the President's customary State of the Union address.

The attacks also had immediate and overwhelming effects upon the United States population. People began rallying around the popularized phrase, "United We Stand," in hopes of being resilient and keeping the American spirit alive in the face of a devastating attack. The majority of the US population rallied behind President Bush and the federal government in widespread support to the recovery and the expectant reaction to the attacks. The highly visible role played by Rudy Giuliani, the Mayor of New York City, won him high praise nationally and in New York City. He was named Person of the Year by Time magazine for 2001, and at times had a higher profile in the US than President Bush.

Two major public reactions to the attacks were a surge of public expressions of patriotism not seen since World War II, marked most often by displays of the American flag; and an unprecedented level of respect, sympathy, and admiration for New York City and New Yorkers as a group by Americans in other parts of the United States. Some criticized this particular reaction, noting that not everyone who died was from New York City (for example, some of the passengers on the planes) and that the Arlington, Virginia community also suffered in the attacks. Many people joined together to help the victims. Gratitude toward uniformed public-safety workers, and especially toward firefighters, was widely expressed in light of both the drama of the risks taken on the scene and the high death toll among the workers. Many people paid tribute to the police officers and firefighters who died during the attacks by wearing NYPD and FDNY hats. The number of casualties among the emergency service personnel was unprecedented.

Blood donations saw a surge in the weeks after 9/11. According to a report by the Journal of the American Medical Association, "...the number of blood donations in the weeks after September 11, 2001, attacks was markedly greater than in the corresponding weeks of 2000 (2.5 times greater in the first week after the attacks; 1.3–1.4 times greater in the second to fourth weeks after the attack)." At the Westminster Kennel Club Dog Show that took place in New York in February 2002, a tribute was paid to the search and rescue dogs who not only assisted in locating survivors and bodies from the rubble but were also inside the World Trade Center buildings before they collapsed.

Backlash and hate crimes

In weeks following the attacks, there was a surge in incidents of harassment and hate crimes against South Asians, Middle Easterners, and anyone thought to be "Middle Eastern-looking" people—particularly Sikhs, because Sikh males usually wear turbans, which are stereotypically and erroneously associated with Muslims by many Americans. Balbir Singh Sodhi, a Sikh man, was one of the first victims of this backlash; he was shot dead on September 15 at the gas station he owned in Mesa, Arizona. Mark Anthony Stroman, a white supremacist, killed two men and injured a third in a shooting spree beginning September 15 in Dallas, Texas. His victims, including Bangladeshi American Rais Bhuiyan, were all targeted because they looked "of Muslim descent". His motive for the killings was revenge for the 9/11 attacks. On July 20, 2011, Stroman was executed for the crime.

In many cities there were reports of vandalism against mosques and other Islamic institutions, including some cases of arson. In the year after the attack, anti-Muslim hate crimes jumped 1,600 percent and this is further aggravated by a climate of prejudice that manifests in different ways.

The only death officially recorded as a homicide in New York City on September 11 was Henryk Siwiak, a Polish immigrant who was shot in Bedford-Stuyvesant, Brooklyn. While he had taken a wrong turn on his way to a new job onto a street known for high rates of robbery and drug dealing, his family has theorized he may have been the victim of a hate crime in the wake of the attacks, since he was wearing camouflage clothing, had dark hair and spoke imperfect, heavily accented English—all of which may have led someone to believe he had something to do with the attackers. The case remains unsolved; police are open to the family's theory but have not classified the killing as a bias crime.

In 2008, author Moustafa Bayoumi released the book How Does It Feel to Be a Problem?: Being Young and Arab in America. The author says mass arrests and deportations of Arabs and Arab Americans were conducted by the various government organizations, including the FBI, often with insufficient evidence to connect them to terrorism; that some were incarcerated indefinitely without notifying the detainee's relatives as if they had just disappeared. Bayoumi maintains deportation of Arabs and Arab-Americans significantly increased following 9/11, often at short notice, saying in one case a man was deported without his clothes.

Long-term effects

Effects on children
The attacks were regarded by some as particularly disturbing to children, in part because of the frequency with which the images were replayed on television. Many schools closed early, especially those with children whose parents worked in Washington, D.C., and New York City. In Sarasota, Florida, Emma E. Booker Elementary School became a part of history, as President George W. Bush was reading to a classroom of children there when the attacks happened.

Psychological studies focused on children exposed to the attacks in Lower Manhattan and New York City found higher rates of clinically significant behavior problems among preschool children, as well as elevated rates of PTSD and depression in the years after the attacks. For children who lost a parent in the attack, psychologists noticed that while some coped well initially, they would at times succumb to bouts of depression and self-harm later in life, or become reluctant to discuss their family history.

Health effects

The thousands of tons of toxic debris resulting from the collapse of the Twin Towers contained more than 2,500 contaminants, including known carcinogens. Subsequent debilitating illnesses among rescue and recovery workers are said to be linked to exposure to these carcinogens. The Bush administration ordered the Environmental Protection Agency (EPA) to issue reassuring statements regarding air quality in the aftermath of the attacks, citing national security; however, the EPA did not determine that air quality had returned to pre-September 11 levels until June 2002.

Health effects also extended to residents, students, and office workers of Lower Manhattan and nearby Chinatown. Several deaths have been linked to the toxic dust, and the victims' names were included in the World Trade Center memorial. As of January 1, 2002 the New York Police Department had received 37 disability claims, and the Fire Department reported 269 disability claims related to injuries suffered as a result of the attacks. Approximately 18,000 people have been estimated to have developed illnesses as a result of the toxic dust. By 2004, nearly half of more than 1,000 screened rescue-and-recovery workers and volunteers reported new and persistent respiratory problems, and more than half reported persistent psychological symptoms. Because of the long latency period between exposure and development of asbestos-related diseases, exposed Manhattan residents, especially rescue-and-recovery workers, can suffer future adverse health effects. One such death related to health effects was the January 6, 2006 death of NYPD James Zadroga which was ruled by a New Jersey coroner as directly due to clean-up at the WTC site. This ruling was unequivocally rejected in October 2007 by the New York City Chief Medical Examiner, Dr. Charles Hirsch, and Medical Examiner Michele Slone. On June 29, 2019, former New York Police Department detective Luis G. Alvarez died from colorectal cancer, with which he was diagnosed in 2016 and is believed to be caused from his three months spent at Ground Zero after 9/11.

There is also scientific speculation that exposure to various toxic products in the air may have negative effects on fetal development. A notable children's environmental health center is currently analyzing the children whose mothers were pregnant during the WTC collapse and were living or working nearby. A study of rescue workers released in April 2010 found that all those studied had impaired lung functions, and that 30–40% were reporting little or no improvement in persistent symptoms that started within the first year of the attack.

Legal 
Years after the attacks, legal disputes over the costs of illnesses related to the attacks were still in the court system. On October 17, 2006, a federal judge rejected New York City's refusal to pay for health costs for rescue workers, allowing for the possibility of numerous suits against the city. Government officials have been faulted for urging the public to return to lower Manhattan in the weeks shortly after the attacks. Christine Todd Whitman, administrator of the EPA in the aftermath of the attacks, was heavily criticized by a U.S. District Judge for incorrectly saying that the area was environmentally safe. Mayor Giuliani was criticized for urging financial industry personnel to return quickly to the greater Wall Street area.

Economic

After the terrorist attack, various repercussions took place that affected the U.S as a whole. All the money and claims that were being put out to help aid the victims of the attack, as well as different security and laws to protect the U.S, caused several layoffs and un-employments. Specifically, It was said that 462 extended masses were layoffs because of the attacks that displaced approximately 130,000 employees. The unemployment rate inclined to a total of 5.0%.

The attacks caused an estimated overall economic loss to the city of $82.8-USD 94.8 billion, with the lower number being consistent with the NYC Partnership's November 2001 estimate and the high end being consistent with the New York City Comptroller's October 2001 estimate. It was calculated that the lost human productive value, life insurance payouts were $2.63 billion, federal payments after offsets were estimated at $2.34 billion and charitable payments were $0.79 billion.

Lost artwork 

It was projected by one individual that the public art that was damaged or destroyed during the attacks was valued at $10 million. Art by Louise Nevelson, Alexander Calder, and James Rosati were all destroyed along with a memorial sculpture by Elyn Zimmerman in memorial for the victims of the 1993 World Trade Center Bombing.

Insurance claims 
As of August 2002, there were approximately 1,464 claims against the city of New York City that amounted to approximately $8.2 billion. Although the New York City's Law Department indicated at the time that the City's liability for the claims would only be around $350 million, provided through an act of Congress. The claims ranged from City employee's personal injuries that totaled around $5.2 billion, suffering due to the loss of life that totaled around $3 billion, and for the destruction of property such as the one filed by AEGIS Insurance Company for $250 million.

Grants and funds

Following the road to recovery, the federal government and state begin issuing grants and various funds to compensate and help those who suffered. The 9/11 Heroes Stamp Program was administered by the Department of Homeland Security which gave funds to those who became disabled from direct contact in the attack or suffered a loss from the attack. The Post- 9/11 GI Bill became a result after 9/11, paying homage to the U.S military soldiers, which provided educational and financial assistance to those soldiers who were returning to civilian life. Federal grant aid assisted states, communities, and local organizations in their efforts to stay safe and remain readily prepared. For that to happen the program law enforcement training and technical assistance grant was created hoping to stop or better compose for a terrorist attack.

The September 11th Victim Compensation fund (VCF) was established to provide financial assistance to those that experienced the disaster directly or those who lost family members from the attack. The fund has provided reimbursements for medical treatments for various conditions affecting victims, including PTSD and health effects from being exposed to toxic air.

Trade relations 
The attacks affected trade relations with foreign countries, complicating the supply of oil demands. After the attack, oil prices skyrocketed.

New infrastructure 

Rebuilding of the area began shortly after clean up, and construction began on the Freedom Tower and the National September 11 Memorial and Museum.

Park51 
Park51 (originally named Cordoba House) is a planned 13-story Muslim community center to be located two blocks from the World Trade Center site in Lower Manhattan. The majority of the center will be open to the general public and its proponents have said the center will promote interfaith dialogue. It will contain a Muslim prayer space that has controversially been referred to as the "Ground Zero mosque", though numerous commentators noted that it was neither a mosque nor at Ground Zero.

It would replace an existing 1850s Italianate-style building that was being used as a Burlington Coat Factory before it was damaged in the September 11 attacks. The proposed multi-faith aspects of the design include a 500-seat auditorium, theater, a performing arts center, a fitness center, a swimming pool, a basketball court, a childcare area, a bookstore, a culinary school, an art studio, a food court, and a memorial to the victims of the September 11 attacks. The prayer space for the Muslim community will accommodate 1,000–2,000 people.

Security and military actions 

The evolution of security and protective services changed tremendously due to the attacks. Immediate changes included air travel policies, airport security and screening, and guidelines that must be obeyed before getting on board. Congress immediately responded after the terrorist attack by passing the Aviation and Transportation Security Act,  which applied to different types of transportation, not just air travel.

Additional screening was another main focus that took place during the period after the attacks, and many passengers were prescreened and advanced screened at different security checkpoints. This led to the major issue of racial profiling and invasion of privacy, as many Middle Eastern-looking people were singled out for further screening. Luggage screening was another main objective, as new technology was introduced to scan passengers' luggage thoroughly and search for weapons or bombs. In addition, some pilots were required by the Department of Homeland Security to carry a firearm on board. Better known as a Federal flight deck officer, these pilots undergo training to prevent terrorist attacks or other potential dangers on an airplane.

Another act was passed known as the USA Patriot Act, which broadened the powers of law enforcement to identify terrorist activity. For example, law enforcement was allowed able to break one's premises without a search warrant and their consent, if they were suspected of terrorist activity. This also included roving wiretaps as a method of surveillance. For instance, the government was allowed to search through one's record searches and intelligence searches. Specifically, if one searched terrorism activities or showed unusual behavior and then deleted their history, the government was able to see that. The purpose of this act was to catch acts of terrorism before any attacks were planned and executed. A program called Total Information Awareness was developed to enhance the technology that would collect and analyze information about every individual in the United States, and trace unusual behaviors that could help prevent terrorist activities. Information that was gathered through the program included internet activity, credit card purchase histories, airline ticket purchases, and medical records.

9/11-related plots and attacks within the US

Thwarted attacks

 A similar al-Qaeda plan to crash airplanes into the US Bank Tower (aka Library Tower) in Los Angeles and in other buildings elsewhere in the US as part of a 'Second Wave' of aircraft hijackings by martyr (suicide) squads to be in the spring or summer of 2002
2001 shoe bomb plot in which a passenger carried shoes that were packed with two types of explosives
 2003 plot by Iyman Faris to blow up the Brooklyn Bridge in New York City
2004 Financial buildings plot which targeted the International Monetary Fund and World Bank buildings in Washington, DC, the New York Stock Exchange and other financial institutions
 2004 Columbus Shopping Mall Bombing Plot
2006 transatlantic aircraft plot which was to involve liquid explosives
2006 Sears Tower plot
2007 Fort Dix attack plot
2007 John F. Kennedy International Airport attack plot
 2009 Northwest Airlines Flight 253 in which a passenger tried to set off plastic explosives sewn to his underwear
2010 Times Square car bombing attempt

Successful attacks

June 1, 2009, Little Rock recruiting office shooting. One person was killed and another was wounded.
November 5, 2009, Fort Hood shooting in Texas. 13 people were killed and 30 others were wounded.
Boston Marathon bombing. 3 killed and over 200 wounded.

Bombings in Kabul, Afghanistan occurred after the attacks and were reposted live by CNN correspondent Nic Robertson less than 24 hours after the attacks in America.

International

The attacks had major worldwide political effects. Many other countries introduced tough anti-terrorism legislation and took action to cut off terrorist finances, including the freezing of bank accounts suspected of being used to fund terrorism. Law enforcement and intelligence agencies stepped up cooperation to arrest terrorist suspects and break up suspected terrorist cells around the world.

Reaction to the attacks in the Muslim world was mixed. Also, shortly after the attack, the media picked up on several celebrations of the attacks in the Middle East with images of these celebrations being broadcast on television and published in print. Less publicized were public displays of sympathy, including candlelight vigils in countries like Iran.

In the immediate aftermath, support for the United States' right to defend itself was expressed across the world, and by United Nations Security Council Resolution 1368. The Australian Prime Minister, John Howard, was in Washington D.C. at the time of the attacks and invoked the ANZUS military alliance as a pledge of Australian assistance to the U.S.

Aid 
In the immediate aftermath of the attacks many United States-based airports would not accept airplane flights to land, causing Operation Yellow Ribbon in which all incoming international flights were rerouted by the FAA to airports in Canada. Many Canadians opened up their homes to stranded travelers and organizations such as the Society for the Prevention of Cruelty to Animals gave comfort to animals and other special groups that were stranded by the diversions.

In France, calls to the United States Embassy were placed by locals who offered rooms within their homes to stranded passengers and observed the official day of mourning with three minutes of silence and stillness.

Memorials and vigils 
The attack prompted numerous memorials and services all over the world with many countries, along with the United States, declaring a national day of mourning. In Berlin, 200,000 Germans marched to show their solidarity with America. The French newspaper of record, Le Monde, ran a front-page headline reading "Nous sommes Tous Américains", or "We are all Americans". In London, the US national anthem was played at the Changing of the Guard at Buckingham Palace. (To mark the Queen's Golden Jubilee, New York City lit the Empire State Building in purple and gold, to say "thank you" for this action.)

Hate crimes
Hate crimes against Muslims increased around the world. For example, Canada experienced a 16-fold increase in anti-Muslim attacks immediately a year after 9/11. In the year leading to the attack, there were only 11 reported crimes but a year following 9/11, there were 173 hate crime cases reported. The same also happened in the United Kingdom and Australia. In the latter's case, a study conducted in Sydney and Melbourne revealed an overwhelming majority of Muslim residents who experienced racism or racist violence since the attack. Another study claimed that hate crimes "increased for all Muslims after 9/11, although the relative risk was much higher for those individuals living in countries with smaller Muslim populations."

An increase in racial tensions was seen in countries such as England, with a number of violent crimes linked to the September 11th attacks. The most severe example was seen in Peterborough, where teenager Ross Parker was murdered by a gang of up to ten Muslims of Pakistani background who had sought a white male to attack.

See also
9/11 Commission Report
9/11 conspiracy theories
Class of 9/11
Fahrenheit 9/11 – a documentary by Michael Moore
Health effects arising from the September 11 attacks
Patriot Day
September 11 attacks
United States government operations and exercises on September 11, 2001

References

Further reading

External links
 The Arab and Iranian Reaction to 911
 "Complete 911 Timeline" from Nov 2001 through present – Provided by the Center for Cooperative Research.
 "Environmental impact of 911 attacks" – Provided by the Center for Cooperative Research.
 
 Ten Years After 9/11 – 2011: Hearings before the Committee on Homeland Security and Governmental Affairs, United States Senate, One Hundred Twelfth Congress First Session - Washington, D.C.: U.S. G.P.O., 2012.

 
Sept
+